Harmochirus luculentus is a species of spiders in the family Salticidae (jumping spiders). It is found in Africa, Zanzibar and Yemen.

References

External links 

 Photograph of H. luculentus at salticidae.org
 Harmochirus luculentus at the World Spider Catalog

Salticidae
Spiders of Africa
Spiders described in 1886